Wellborn may refer to:

Wellborn, Florida, an unincorporated community in Florida, United States
Wellborn, Texas, an unincorporated community in Texas, United States
Wellborn Formation, a geologic formation in Texas, United States
Wellborn (Eufaula, Alabama), a historic house in Eufaula, Alabama, United States

People
Marshall Johnson Wellborn (1808–1874), American politician
Max Wellborn (1862–1957), American banker
Olin Wellborn (1843–1921), American politician

See also 
 Welborn, a surname and given name